Mahmudabad (also Romanized as Maḩmūdābād and Mahmood Abad; also known as Mazra‘eh) is a village in Meshkan Rural District, Poshtkuh District, Neyriz County, Fars Province, Iran. At the 2006 census, its population was 16, in 6 families.

References 

Populated places in Neyriz County